Terry H. Cahal (September 4, 1802 – April 15, 1851) was an American jurist and politician in the Antebellum South. He served as the Speaker of the Tennessee Senate and the Chancellor of Tennessee.

Early life
Terry H. Cahal was born on September 4, 1802 in Virginia. He served in the First Seminole War of 1816–1819.

Career
Cahal was a lawyer and politician. He served as a member of the Tennessee twice. He also served as its Speaker once. He subsequently served as the "Chancellor" of Tennessee. In 1833, he warned against secession in the wake of the Nullification Crisis. On slavery, Cahal argued:

Personal life and death
Cahal had a wife named Ann. He died on April 15, 1851.

Works

References

1802 births
1851 deaths
People from Virginia
Politicians from Nashville, Tennessee
American people of the Seminole Wars
Tennessee lawyers
Tennessee state senators
Anti-black racism in the United States
19th-century American politicians
19th-century American lawyers